Orthoprosopa multicolor is a species of hoverfly in the family Syrphidae.

Distribution
Australia.

References

Eristalinae
Insects described in 1926
Diptera of Australasia